Vancouveria chrysantha is a species of flowering plant in the barberry family known by the common names golden inside-out flower and Siskiyou inside-out flower.

Description
Vancouveria chrysantha is a rhizomatous perennial herb with a short, mostly underground stem. It produces a patch of basal leaves which are each made up of round, shallowly lobed leaflets borne on long, reddish petioles.

The inflorescence appears in the spring to early summer. It is a raceme of flowers on a long, erect peduncle with hairy, glandular branches. Each drooping flower has six inner sepals which look like petals. They are bright yellow, up to a centimeter long, and reflexed back, or upwards, away from the flower center. Lying against the sepals are the smaller true petals, which are also bright yellow, curled, and hood-like. There are six stamens and a large glandular ovary.

Distribution
The plant is native to northwestern California and southwestern Oregon.

It occurs in the Klamath Mountains below . It grows in dry mountain habitat in chaparral and forests, often on serpentine soils.

References

External links
Jepson Manual eFlora (TJM2) treatment of Vancouveria chrysantha (Siskiyou inside-out flower)
U.C. CalPhotos gallery: Vancouveria chrysantha

chrysantha
Flora of California
Flora of Oregon
Flora of the Klamath Mountains
Natural history of the California chaparral and woodlands
Flora without expected TNC conservation status